The 1996 WTA Tour Championships, also known by its sponsored name Corel WTA Tour Championships, was a women's tennis tournament played on indoor carpet courts at Madison Square Garden in New York City, New York in the United States. It was the 24th edition of the season-ending singles championships and the 21st edition of the year-end doubles championships. The event was part of the 1995 WTA Tour and was held from November 13 and November 19, 1995. First-seeded Steffi Graf won the singles title, her fourth, and the accompanying $500,000 first-prize money.

Finals

Singles

 Steffi Graf defeated  Anke Huber, 6–1, 2–6, 6–1, 4–6, 6–3.

Doubles

 Jana Novotná /  Arantxa Sánchez Vicario defeated  Gigi Fernández /  Natasha Zvereva, 6–2, 6–1.

References

External links
 
 ITF – tournament edition details
 WTA – tournament edition details

WTA Tour Championships
WTA Tour Championships
WTA Tour Championships
WTA Tour Championships
1990s in Manhattan
WTA Tour Championships
Madison Square Garden
Sports competitions in New York City
Sports in Manhattan
Tennis tournaments in New York City